Vaskovo Airport (Russian: Аэропорт Васьково) is an airport in Arkhangelsk Oblast, Russia located 13 km southwest of central Arkhangelsk. It is 10 km west of Isakogorka station.

The airport is a general aviation airfield. It is the main base for the airline 2nd Arkhangelsk Aviation Enterprise. Commercial flights in small prop-planes operate to the Solovetsky Islands three times a week.

References

Airports built in the Soviet Union
Airports in Arkhangelsk Oblast